Basket Racing Club Luxembourg (also Racing Luxembourg) is a Luxembourgish professional basketball club. The club has won the national championship 3 times, along with 1 Luxembourg Cup.

Honours

Luxembourgian League
 Winners (3): 1966-67, 1997–98, 1999-00

Luxembourgian Cup
 Winners (1): 2000-01

External links 
 Basket Racing Club Luxembourg official site

Basketball teams in Luxembourg